Legacurry is a townland of 226 acres in County Antrim, Northern Ireland. It is situated in the civil parish of Kilraghts and the historic barony of Dunluce Upper.

See also
List of townlands in County Antrim

References

Townlands of County Antrim
Civil parish of Kilraghts